Vasile Adam (born October 10, 1956 in the Soviet Union), in little town, Nisporeni) is Moldovan woodcarver known for furniture-making and icons.

His works are mostly traditional woodworking. Artist has a workshop (from 1996) in his native town in which he provide integrated courses of the woodcarving. Also Vasile Adam works predominantly for private clients. His creations and projects are spread among national collections as well as international ones.

Major works of the artist was donated to chapel of Romanian People's Salvation Cross and to monastery 'Ciuflea' located in Chisinau.

In his career, the woodworker tried different techniques and traditions in art, including sculpture. One of his stone creations is a monument to the Soviet heroes, who have died during the World War II. The monument rises over the German town Templin.

Adam is a member of Handicraftsmen's union of Moldova and Academy of Traditional Arts (Sibiu, Romania)

Selected works

See also
Romanian People's Salvation Cross

References

External links
Official website
Moldova 1, Episode of 'Tezaur' TV programme
Ziarul naţional, „Părintele” sfinților
Official page of Handicraftsmen's union of Moldova

Woodworking
Moldovan artists
1956 births
Living people